The Williams Bridge is a wooden covered bridge built in 1884 and is located in southern Indiana.

Location
The Williams Bridge is located in Spice Valley Township in Lawrence County, Indiana, and crosses the East Fork of the White River on Huron and Williams Road, south of State Road 450. It is near the unincorporated town of Williams, about two miles downriver from the Williams Dam and eight miles southwest of Bedford.

Construction
The bridge is a Howe Truss design and was built in 1884 by Joseph 'J.J.' Daniels.

History
In 1981, the bridge was added to the National Register of Historic Places. It was the longest covered bridge in Indiana that was still open to vehicular traffic. The bridge was closed to traffic around September 20, 2010.

References

External links

National Register of Historic Places in Lawrence County, Indiana
Covered bridges on the National Register of Historic Places in Indiana
Bridges completed in 1884
Wooden bridges in Indiana
Transportation buildings and structures in Lawrence County, Indiana
Tourist attractions in Lawrence County, Indiana
Pedestrian bridges in the United States
Former road bridges in the United States
Road bridges on the National Register of Historic Places in Indiana
Howe truss bridges in the United States